Fumarate lyase is a substrate of the lyase class of enzymes.  

It been shown to share a short conserved sequence around a methionine which is probably involved in the catalytic activity of this type of enzymes. The following are examples of members of this family:

 3-carboxymuconate lactonizing enzyme,  (3-carboxy-cis,cis-muconate cycloisomerase), an enzyme involved in aromatic acids catabolism. 
 Delta-crystallin shares around 90% sequence identity with arginosuccinate lyase, showing that it is an example of a 'hijacked' enzyme - accumulated mutations have, however, rendered the protein enzymatically inactive.
 Class I Fumarase enzyme,  (fumarate hydratase), which catalyzes the reversible hydration of fumarate to L-malate. Class I enzymes are thermolabile dimeric enzymes (as for example: Escherichia coli fumA and fumB).
 Arginosuccinase,  (argininosuccinate lyase), which catalyzes the formation of arginine and fumarate from argininosuccinate, the last step in the biosynthesis of arginine. 
Aspartate ammonia-lyase,  (aspartase), which catalyzes the reversible conversion of aspartate to fumarate and ammonia. This reaction is analogous to that catalyzed by fumarase, except that ammonia rather than water is involved in the trans-elimination reaction. 
 class II Fumarase enzyme, are thermostable and tetrameric and are found in prokaryotes (as for example: Escherichia coli fumC) as well as in eukaryotes. The sequence of the two classes of fumarases are not closely related.
 Adenylosuccinase,  (adenylosuccinate lyase), which catalyzes the eighth step in the de novo biosynthesis of purines, the formation of 5'-phosphoribosyl-5-amino-4-imidazolecarboxamide and fumarate from 1-(5- phosphoribosyl)-4-(N-succino-carboxamide). That enzyme can also catalyze the formation of fumarate and AMP from adenylosuccinate.

References

Protein domains
Lyases